Bossanova is the third studio album by American alternative rock band Pixies. It was released on August 13, 1990 by English independent record label 4AD in the United Kingdom and by Elektra Records in the United States. Because of 4AD's independent status, major label Elektra handled distribution in the US. 

Bossanova reached number 70 on the Billboard 200. The album peaked at number three in the UK Albums Chart. Two singles were released from Bossanova: "Velouria" and "Dig for Fire". Both charted on the Billboard Modern Rock Tracks chart in the US, at No. 4 and  No. 11, respectively.

Background 
After Pixies finished touring obligations for their second album, Doolittle (1989), in January 1990, band members Black Francis, Joey Santiago, and David Lovering moved from Boston to Los Angeles. Bassist Kim Deal stayed in the UK to record the Breeders' first album in January with producer Steve Albini, although she ultimately decided to travel out to Los Angeles with the rest of the group. Lovering stated that he, Santiago, and Francis moved to Los Angeles because that's where they intended to record their next album. The three band members lived in the Oakwood apartments, along with comic Garrett Morris and members of the band White Lion. Producer Gil Norton also moved into the apartment complex.

Recording and production 
Pixies started recording material for Bossanova at Cherokee Studios in February 1990, where the sessions ran into problems. Norton said that nothing could be recorded after 6 p.m. because the recording desk would pick up pirate radio stations. Norton decided to work on overdubs in another studio for a few days until the problem was corrected, but when he returned to Cherokee, he found that any time something was plugged into a guitar amplifier it would generate "this incredible hum". Norton refused to tell 4AD owner Ivo Watts-Russell about the problem until he felt he could address it. One day while visiting a bar, Norton and Santiago met producer Rick Rubin and informed him of their situation. Rubin had his secretary find another studio for the group, and the band continued recording at Master Control.

Composition 
One album song, "Blown Away", had been written in Spain in early June 1989 while on tour. The song was recorded with producer Gil Norton, who was specially flown in for the one-song session, at Hansa Tonstudio in Berlin, after their June 19 concert there.

In contrast to previous records, many songs were written in the studio and few demo recordings were created. Santiago said that the band only practiced for a two-week period, in contrast to previous albums, when the band would rehearse constantly in Boston. Black Francis noted, "So I was writing [lyrics] on napkins five minutes before I sang. Sometimes it's good, sometimes not. That's just the nature of that songwriting."

Release 
The album was released in August 1990 on 4AD in the UK, and jointly by 4AD and Elektra in the USA. After 4AD re-acquired sole distribution rights for Pixies' back catalog, a re-issued (although not remastered) CD appeared solely on 4AD in the US in 2004. Mobile Fidelity Sound Lab released a version in 2008 that was remastered from the original analog master tapes.

Critical reception 

The UK reviews of Bossanova were generally positive. In his September 1990 review of Bossanova, Qs Mat Snow said that "the Pixies are masters of the calculated incongruity," and commented that "they give other rockers an object lesson in the first principles of how it should be done." Terry Staunton of NME noted that the album's production "leans towards the harsh garage grunge of Surfer Rosa, although the songs retain the strong melodies of Doolittle," and said that "Bossanova is the composite Pixies LP."

In comparison to the band's previous albums, Rolling Stone reviewer Moira McCormick described Bossanova as "more of a straight-ahead rock album – by the Pixies' standards, meaning it's still safely off the mainstream."

UK magazine Select made Bossanova their album of the year for 1990.  The album was also included in the book 1001 Albums You Must Hear Before You Die.

Track listing

Personnel 

Pixies
 Black Francis – vocals, guitar
 Kim Deal – bass guitar, vocals
 David Lovering – drums, vocals
 Joey Santiago – lead guitar

Additional musicians
 Robert F. Brunner – theremin ("Velouria", "Is She Weird")

Technical
 Gil Norton – producer
 Alistair Clay – engineer
 Steven Haigler – mixing
 Jack Benson – assistant engineer
 Gregg Barrett – assistant engineer
 Moses Schneider – assistant engineer
 Andrew Ballard – assistant engineer
 Scott Blockland – assistant engineer
 Howie Weinberg – mastering
 Vaughan Oliver / V23 – design
 Chris Bigg – design assistance
 Pirate Design – artwork
 Anne Garrigues – artwork
 Simon Larbalestier – photography
 Kevin Westenberg – photography

Charts

Certifications and sales

Notes

References 
 Frank, Josh; Ganz, Caryn. Fool the World: The Oral History of a Band Called Pixies. Virgin Books, 2005. .

1990 albums
4AD albums
Albums produced by Gil Norton
Elektra Records albums
Pixies (band) albums
Grunge albums
Space rock albums